North Brunswick is a proposed railroad station along the Northeast Corridor (NEC) in North Brunswick, New Jersey, that will be built by New Jersey Transit Rail Operations (NJT) to serve its Northeast Corridor Line. Approved in 2013, it was planned to open in 2018 and projected to cost $30 million. It is one of several projects along the "New Jersey Speedway" section of the NEC.

The station was proposed for the former Johnson & Johnson facility on Route 1 and Aaron Road by the new owners of the  site, and is part of a transit-oriented development known as Main Street North Brunswick. New Jersey Transit's Fiscal 2015 capital budget allocated funding for the station. As of mid-2017, construction of the project had not begun. In October 2017, it was announced the project had received $50 million from the Transportation Trust Fund. In October 2019, NJT and Middlesex County had committed $70 million to start work on the station. In 2021 the County Improvement Authority hired WSP USA to design the station. Initial designs were released in March 2023.

Mid-Line Loop and County Yard
NJT plans to build a flying junction and balloon loop called the Mid-Line Loop between MP 36 and MP 37 on the NEC south of the new station, allowing trains to turn around and enter and leave service without crossing over tracks, and function as a staging area for a mid-line terminus. NJT originates trains to Newark Penn Station and New York Penn Station during peak hours from the Jersey Avenue station, to the north in New Brunswick.

NJT is creating a "train haven" at County Yard where equipment could be stored during serious storms. The work involves reconfiguring and expanding the yard into the adjacent Mile Run Yard, which is not in service.

As of 2019, construction plans for the new station did not include construction of the mid-line loop.

High-speed corridor
In August 2011, the United States Department of Transportation obligated $450 million to a six-year project to improve  of the Northeast Corridor for a high-speed corridor between New Brunswick and Trenton along what is called the "New Jersey Speedway".

See also
 List of New Jersey Transit stations

References 

Proposed NJ Transit rail stations
Proposed public transportation in New Jersey
Stations on the Northeast Corridor
Railway stations in Middlesex County, New Jersey
North Brunswick, New Jersey